Brecher Glacier is a broad glacier  long in the north Churchill Mountains that flows north between the Rundle Peaks and Mandarich Massif into Byrd Glacier. It was named after Henry H. Brecher of the Byrd Polar Research Center, Ohio State University; he conducted Antarctic glaciological investigations for over 30 years, 1960–95, including determinations of surface velocities and elevations on Byrd Glacier.

References 

Glaciers of Oates Land